Peter Schnitler (17 January 1690 – 23 January 1751) was a Danish/Norwegian jurist and military officer. He was born in Copenhagen, and was a nephew of landowner and civil servant Hans Nobel. He is particularly remembered for his work with the Norwegian/Swedish Border Commission in the 1740s. He died in Trondheim in 1751.

References

1690 births
1751 deaths
Military personnel from Copenhagen
Norwegian jurists
Norwegian Army personnel
Danish jurists
Danish military personnel